Jeyran is a village in Kurdistan Province, Iran.

Jeyran may also refer to:

Places
 Jeyran Bolagh
 Jeyran Bolaghi (disambiguation)
 Jeyran Darreh
 Jeyran-e Olya (disambiguation)
 Jeyran-e Sofla (disambiguation)

People
 Jeyran (wife of Naser al-Din Shah)